The NASCAR Truck Series Drivers' Championship is awarded by the chairman of NASCAR to the most successful NASCAR Camping World Truck Series racing car driver over a season, as determined by a points system based on race results. The Drivers' Championship was first awarded in 1995 to Mike Skinner. The first driver to win multiple Championships was Ron Hornaday Jr., in 1996 and 1998. The most recent Drivers' Champion is Zane Smith who won his first championship in 2022.

Overall, Nineteen different drivers have won the Championship, with Ron Hornaday Jr. holding the record for most titles at four. Crafton has the record for most consecutive Drivers' Championships, winning two from 2013 to 2014. Erik Jones is the youngest driver to claim the NASCAR Truck Series Championship, being 19 years, 5 months, and 21 days old when he won the 2015 title. Hornaday is the oldest winner of the NASCAR Truck Series Title; he was 51 years, 4 months and 24 days old when he won the 2009 championship.

By season

By driver

Regular Season Champions 
Since 2018 NASCAR has awarded a regular season championship for the driver with the most points heading into the playoffs with 2017 being grandfathered in.

See also
 NASCAR
 NASCAR Camping World Truck Series
 List of NASCAR Cup Series champions
 List of NASCAR Xfinity Series champions
 List of NASCAR teams
 List of NASCAR drivers
 List of NASCAR race tracks

References

 
NASCAR Truck Series champions
Truck Series champions
Truck Series